This was the first edition of the tournament.

Maegan Manasse and Jessica Pegula won the title, defeating Desirae Krawczyk and Giuliana Olmos in the final, 1–6, 6–4, [10–8].

Seeds

Draw

Draw

References
Main Draw

Oracle Challenger Series – Houston - Doubles